Passy is a commune in the Haute-Savoie department in the Auvergne-Rhône-Alpes region in south-eastern France. It is part of the urban area of Sallanches.

Located there is the Sancellemoz sanatorium, where Professor Marie Curie died.

Lac Vert is located in the commune. The commune has a railway station, on the Saint-Gervais–Vallorcine line.

Population

See also
Communes of the Haute-Savoie department

References

Communes of Haute-Savoie